Norman Graham Hill  (15 February 1929 – 29 November 1975) was a British racing driver and team owner, who was the Formula One World Champion twice, winning in  and  as well as being runner up on three occasions (1963, 1964 and 1965). Despite not passing his driving test until 1953 when he was already 24 years of age, and only entering the world of motorsports a year later, Hill would go on to become one of the greatest drivers of his generation. Hill is most celebrated for being the only driver ever to win the Triple Crown of Motorsport, an achievement which he defined as winning the Indianapolis 500, the 24 Hours of Le Mans, and the Formula One World Drivers' Championship. While several of his peers have also espoused this definition, including fellow F1 World Champion Jacques Villeneuve, the achievement is today most commonly defined as including the Monaco Grand Prix rather than the Formula One World Championship. By this newer definition, Hill is still the only driver to have ever won the Triple Crown, winning at Monaco with such frequency in the 1960s (5x; 1963, 1964, 1965, 1968, 1969) that he became known as "Mr. Monaco". Hill crashed at the 1969 United States Grand Prix and was seriously injured, breaking both his legs and ending his season. Although he would recover and continue to race until 1975, Hill's career would never again reach the same heights, and the Monaco Grand Prix victory earlier in 1969 would be his last victory in Formula One.

Wins in the most prestigious races of all three of the major disciplines of motor racing cemented Hill's position as one of the most complete drivers in the history of the sport. Hill was also a well liked television personality and was frequently seen on television screens in the 1970s in a non-sporting capacity, appearing on a variety of programmes including panel games.

Upon leaving Brabham, Hill set up his own team in 1973, operating under the name Embassy Hill. Hill continued to race, however after failing to qualify for the 1975 Monaco Grand Prix he retired from driving to concentrate on the day-to-day operations of the team. That same year Hill and five other members of the Embassy Hill team were killed when the aeroplane Hill was piloting from France crashed in fog at night on Arkley golf course while attempting to land at Elstree Airfield in north London.

Hill and his son Damon were the first father and son pair to win Formula One World Championships. Hill's grandson Josh, Damon's son, also raced his way through the ranks until he retired from Formula Three in 2013 at the age of 22.

Early life
Born in Hampstead, London, Hill attended Hendon Technical College and joined Smiths Instruments as an apprentice engineer. He was conscripted into the Royal Navy and served as an Engine Room Artificer (ERA) on the light cruiser HMS Swiftsure, rising to the rank of petty officer. After leaving the Navy he rejoined Smiths Instruments.

Racing career

Hill did not pass his driving test until he was 24 years old, and he himself described his first car as "A wreck. A budding racing driver should own such a car, as it teaches delicacy, poise and anticipation, mostly the latter I think!" He had been interested in motorcycles but in 1954 he saw an advertisement for the Universal Motor Racing Club at Brands Hatch offering laps for five shillings. He made his debut in a Cooper 500 Formula 3 car and was committed to racing thereafter. Hill joined Team Lotus as a mechanic soon after but quickly talked his way into the cockpit. The Lotus presence in Formula One allowed him to make his debut at the 1958 Monaco Grand Prix, retiring with a halfshaft failure.

In 1960, Hill joined BRM, he won also in that year on 8 May 1960 the Targa Florio in the class Sports 1600 together with a German driver Edgar Barth in a Porsche 718, and won the world championship with BRM in 1962. He was known for his race preparation, keeping records of the settings on his car and working long hours with his mechanics. Hill was also part of the so-called 'British invasion' of drivers and cars in the Indianapolis 500 during the mid-1960s, triumphing there in 1966 in a Lola-Ford.

At the same time, Hill along with his F1 contemporaries competed in the British Saloon Car Championship, scoring several outright wins. He achieved a best finish of sixth overall in 1961 driving a Jaguar Mark 2.

In 1967, back at Lotus, Hill helped to develop the Lotus 49 with the new Cosworth-V8 engine. It fell to Hill to perform the initial testing of the new car and its engine. After the first shakedown run, Hill quipped "Well, it's got some poke! Not a bad old tool." After teammates Jim Clark and Mike Spence were killed in early 1968, Hill led the team, and won his second world championship in 1968. The Lotus had a reputation of being very fragile and dangerous at that time, especially with the new aerodynamic aids which caused similar crashes of Hill and Jochen Rindt at the 1969 Spanish Grand Prix. A crash at the 1969 United States Grand Prix at Watkins Glen broke both his legs and interrupted his career. Typically, when asked soon after the crash if he wanted to pass on a message to his wife, Hill replied "Just tell her that I won't be dancing for two weeks."

Upon recovery Hill continued to race in F1 for several more years, but never again with the same level of success. Colin Chapman, believing Hill was a spent force, placed him in Rob Walker's team for 1970, sweetening the deal with one of the brand-new Lotus 72 cars. Although Hill scored points in 1970 he started the season far from fully fit and the 72 was not fully developed until late in the season. Hill moved to Brabham for 1971–2; his last win in Formula One was in the non-Championship International Trophy at Silverstone in 1971 with the "lobster claw" Brabham. The team was in flux after the retirements of Sir Jack Brabham and then Ron Tauranac's sale to Bernie Ecclestone; Hill did not settle there.

Hill was known during the latter part of his career for his wit and became a popular personality – he was a regular guest on television and wrote a notably frank and witty autobiography, Life at the Limit, when recovering from his 1969 accident. A second autobiography, which covered his career up until his retirement from racing simply called Graham was published posthumously in 1976. A staunch campaigner for road safety, Hill presented a series for Thames Television entitled Advanced Driving with Graham Hill comprising six 30-minute programmes broadcast weekly in June and July 1974. A book accompanying the series giving advice on safer and responsible driving was co-written by him. Hill was also irreverently immortalized on a Monty Python episode ("It's the Arts (or: Intermission)" sketch called "Historical Impersonations"), in which a Gumby appears asking to "see John the Baptist's impersonation of Graham Hill."  The head of St. John the Baptist appears (with a stuck-on moustache in Hill's style) on a silver platter, which runs around the floor making putt-putt noises of a race car engine.

Hill was involved with four films between 1966 and 1974, including appearances in Grand Prix and Caravan to Vaccarès, in which he appeared as a helicopter pilot.

Although Hill had concentrated on F1 he also maintained a presence in sports car racing throughout his career (including two runs in the Rover-BRM gas turbine car at Le Mans). As his F1 career drew to a close he became part of the Matra sports car team, taking a victory in the 1972 24 Hours of Le Mans with Henri Pescarolo. This victory completed the so-called Triple Crown of Motorsport which is alternatively defined as winning either:
 the Indianapolis 500 (won by Hill in 1966), the 24 Hours of Le Mans (1972) and the Monaco Grand Prix (1963–65, 1968, 1969), or
 the Indianapolis 500, the 24 Hours of Le Mans and the Formula One World Championship (1962, 1968).
Using either definition, Hill is still the only person ever to have accomplished this feat.

Hill set up his own team in 1973: Embassy Hill with sponsorship from Imperial Tobacco. The team used chassis from Shadow and Lola before evolving the Lola into its own design in 1975. After failing to qualify for the 1975 Monaco Grand Prix, where he had won five times, Hill retired from driving to concentrate on running the team and supporting his protege Tony Brise.

Along with Stirling Moss, Hill put his name to and supported the Grand Prix Midget Championship, which started in 1975, with the aim of bringing low cost motor sport to people who wanted to try a new career.

Hill's record of 176 Grand Prix starts remained in place for over a decade until being equalled by Jacques Laffite.

Family
Hill married Bette in 1955; because Hill had spent all his money on his racing career, she paid for the wedding. They had two daughters, Brigitte and Samantha, and a son, Damon, who himself later became Formula One World Champion – the first son of a former world champion to emulate his father.

The family lived in Mill Hill during the 1960s. The house now features an English Heritage blue plaque. During the early 1970s, Hill moved to Lyndhurst House in Shenley in Hertfordshire. The house is now owned by musician Jeff Wayne. Well known for throwing extravagant parties at his houses to which most of the Grand Prix paddock and other famous guests attended, Hill was universally popular.

Rowing

Before taking up motor racing, Hill spent several years actively involved in rowing. Initially, he rowed at Southsea Rowing Club, while stationed in Portsmouth with the Royal Navy and at Auriol Rowing Club in Hammersmith. He met his future wife Bette at a Boxing Day party at Auriol and, while courting her, he also coached her clubmates at Stuart Ladies' Rowing Club on the River Lea.

In 1952 he joined London Rowing Club, then as now one of the largest and most successful clubs in Great Britain. From 1952 to 1954, Hill rowed in twenty finals with London, usually as stroke of the crew, eight of which resulted in wins. He also stroked the London eight in the highly prestigious Grand Challenge Cup at Henley Royal Regatta, losing a semi-final to Union Sportif Metropolitaine des Transports, France by a length.

Through his racing career he continued to support rowing and London. In 1968 when the club began a financial appeal to modernise its clubhouse, Hill launched proceedings by driving an old Morris Oxford, which had been obtained for £5, head-on into a boundary wall. Hill made three runs to reduce the wall to rubble, and the car was subsequently sold for £15.

Hill felt that the experience gained in rowing helped him in his motor-racing. He wrote in his autobiography:

"I really enjoyed my rowing. It really taught me a lot about myself, and I also think it is a great character-building sport...The self discipline required for rowing and the 'never say die' attitude obviously helped me through the difficult years that lay ahead."

Hill adopted the colours and cap design of London Rowing Club for his racing helmet – dark blue with white oar-shaped tabs. His son Damon and grandson Josh later adopted the same colours with permission from the club.

Death

Hill died on 29 November 1975 at the controls of his Piper PA-23 Aztec twin-engine light aircraft when it crashed near Arkley in the London Borough of Barnet, while on a night approach to Elstree Airfield in thick fog. On board with him were five other members of the Embassy Hill team who all died: manager Ray Brimble, mechanics Tony Alcock and Terry Richards, driver Tony Brise, and designer Andy Smallman. The party was returning from a car-testing session at the Paul Ricard Circuit in southern France.

The subsequent investigation revealed that Hill's aircraft, originally registered in the US as  had been removed from the FAA register and at the time of the accident was "unregistered and stateless", despite still displaying its original markings. Furthermore, Hill's American FAA pilot certification had expired, as had his instrument rating. His UK IMC rating, which would have permitted him to fly in the weather conditions that prevailed at the time, was also out of date and invalid. Hill was effectively uninsured. The investigation into the crash was ultimately inconclusive, but pilot error was deemed the most likely explanation.

Hill's funeral was held at St Albans Abbey, and he is buried at St Botolph's graveyard, Shenleybury.  The church has since been deconsecrated so the tomb now sits in a private garden.

Legacy
After his death, Silverstone village, home to the track of the same name, named a road, Graham Hill, after him and there is a "Graham Hill Road" on The Shires estate in nearby Towcester. Graham Hill Bend at Brands Hatch is also named in his honour. A blue plaque commemorates Hill at 32 Parkside, in Mill Hill, London NW7. In Bourne, Lincolnshire, where Hill's former team BRM is based, a road called Graham Hill Way is named in his honour. Also a nursery school in Lusevera, Italy, was named in his honour.

Bibliography
Life at the Limit - 1970
Graham Hill's Motor Racing Book - 1970
Graham Hill's Car Racing Guide - 1971 (with Mike Kettlewood)
Advanced Driving with Graham Hill - 1975 (with Neil Ewart) 
Graham - 1976 (with Neil Ewart)

Career results

Career summary

Complete Formula One World Championship results
(key) (Races in bold indicate pole position, races in italics indicate fastest lap)

Complete Formula One non-championship results
(key) (Races in bold indicate pole position) (Races in italics indicate fastest lap)

Complete USAC Championship Car results

Indianapolis 500 results

Hill failed to qualify the innovative John Crosthwaite (who had worked with Hill at Team Lotus) designed 'roller skate' car for the 1963 Indianapolis 500 race after crashing in practice. Hill, who had been commuting weekly due to other commitments in Europe, would not wait in the USA while the car was repaired and risk not qualifying or qualifying badly.
Hill's 1966 victory marked the first win by a rookie driver since Frank Lockhart's 1927 win and the last until Juan Pablo Montoya's visit to Victory Lane in 2000 (Montoya has also emulated Hill's feat of winning both the Indianapolis 500 and the Monaco Grand Prix).
Hill entered the 1969 Indianapolis 500, but his car (Lotus-Ford Chassis 64/2) was withdrawn during practice along with those of Mario Andretti and Jochen Rindt due to delays rectifying problems associated with hub failure on Andretti's car.

Complete Tasman Series results

24 Hours of Le Mans results

1963 Rover-BRM ran for the ACO prize for a gas turbine car covering a minimum of 3600 km, not officially classified.

Complete British Saloon Car Championship results
(key) (Races in bold indicate pole position; races in italics indicate fastest lap.)

† Events with 2 races staged for the different classes.

 Car over 1000cc - Not eligible for points.

Complete Canadian-American Challenge Cup results
(key) (Races in bold indicate pole position) (Races in italics indicate fastest lap)

Credits and honours
Hill's easy wit and charm helped him become a television personality, notably on the BBC show Call My Bluff with Patrick Campbell and Frank Muir. For a number of years in the early 1970s he appeared as one half of a double act, with Jackie Stewart, as an insert within the BBC Sports Personality of the Year show. In June 1975 he appeared alongside his son, Damon Hill, on the popular television programme Jim'll Fix It. His appearance was later rebroadcast as part of the twentieth anniversary celebrations of the programme in January 1995, with Damon presenting a new segment at the end.

Hill was appointed Officer of the Order of the British Empire (OBE) in the 1968 Birthday Honours for services to motor racing. In 1990, he was inducted into the International Motorsports Hall of Fame.

A one-off BBC Four documentary called Graham Hill: Driven was first broadcast on 26 May 2008.

References

External links

Graham Hill profile at The 500 Owners Association
Grand Prix History – Hall of Fame, Graham Hill 
Graham Hill Statistics
Graham Hill Photos
The Greatest 33
The Greatest 33 Profile

1929 births
1975 deaths
English racing drivers
English Formula One drivers
Formula One World Drivers' Champions
Formula One race winners
Formula One team owners
Formula One team principals
Team Lotus Formula One drivers
BRM Formula One drivers
Brabham Formula One drivers
Rob Walker Racing Team Formula One drivers
Hill Formula One drivers
Indianapolis 500 drivers
Indianapolis 500 winners
24 Hours of Le Mans drivers
24 Hours of Le Mans winning drivers
12 Hours of Reims drivers
International Motorsports Hall of Fame inductees
International Race of Champions drivers
Aviators killed in aviation accidents or incidents in England
People from Hampstead
Sportspeople from London
BRDC Gold Star winners
British Touring Car Championship drivers
Tasman Series drivers
Accidental deaths in London
World Sportscar Championship drivers
English motorsport people
Victims of aviation accidents or incidents in 1975
Porsche Motorsports drivers
Officers of the Order of the British Empire